The El Jobean Hotel (also known as the Grand Hotel-El Jobean Fishing Lodge) is a historic hotel in El Jobean, Florida, United States. It is located at 4381 Garden Road. On September 29, 1999, it was added to the U.S. National Register of Historic Places.

References and external links

 Charlotte County listings at National Register of Historic Places

National Register of Historic Places in Charlotte County, Florida
Defunct hotels in Florida